Long Yellow Road is the second album by the Toshiko Akiyoshi – Lew Tabackin Big Band.  It was named Best Jazz Album of the year by Stereo Review magazine. In 1976, the album received a Grammy Award nomination for Best Jazz Performance by a Big Band.

"Long Yellow Road" is the title of two other albums by the Toshiko Akiyoshi Trio (1961) and the Toshiko Akiyoshi Quartet (1970).

Track listing

Personnel
 Toshiko Akiyoshi – piano
 Lew Tabackin – tenor saxophone, flute, piccolo
 Stu Blumberg – trumpet (on "The First Night", Opus No. Zero" and "Children in the Temple Ground")
 John Madrid – trumpet (on "Long Yellow Road")
 Lynn Nicholson – trumpet (on "Quadrille Anyone?" and "Since Perry/Yet Another Tear")
 Mike Price – trumpet
 Don Rader – trumpet
 Bobby Shew – trumpet
 Charlie Loper – trombone
 Bruce Paulson – trombone (except on "Long Yellow Road")
 Jim Sawyer – trombone (on "Long Yellow Road")
 Phil Teele – bass trombone
 Britt Woodman – trombone
 Dick Spencer – alto saxophone, flute, clarinet
 Gary Foster – alto saxophone, soprano saxophone, flute, clarinet  (except on "Opus No. Zero")
 Joe Roccisano – alto saxophone (on "Opus No. Zero")
 Tom Peterson – tenor saxophone, alto flute, clarinet
 Bill Perkins – baritone saxophone, alto flute, bass clarinet
 Gene Cherico – bass
 Peter Donald – drums (except on "Opus No. Zero" and "Since Perry/Yet Another Tear")
 Chuck Flores  – drums (on "Opus No. Zero" and "Since Perry/Yet Another Tear")
 Tokuko Kaga – vocal (on "Children in the Temple Ground")

References

Toshiko Akiyoshi – Lew Tabackin Big Band albums
1975 albums